Corky Quakenbush (c. 1958, age 62) is an American worker in motion pictures and TV series in a wide variety of different jobs, including camera work, writing, and production. One of his specialties is in stop-motion animation. 

Also, Quakenbush worked in the production of Carl Sagan's acclaimed science series COSMOS during 1979–80.

Animation
Quakenbush is known for the dozens of animated short films he created for MADtv on Fox TV, as well as his parodies of the Rankin/Bass Rudolph the Red-Nosed Reindeer for Christmas episodes of series such as That '70s Show and the George Lopez TV series. These earned him mention in the book The Enchanted World of Rankin/Bass by Rick Goldschmidt. Quakenbush's films are generally known for adult-oriented themes of comic violence, and they often find humor in the blending of the innocent with the "profane".

Short films
Quakenbush is a prolific short filmmaker who, through his company Space Bass Films, has produced more than 100 short films that have been included in broadcast and cable television shows, screened as individual entries or in their own programs at film festivals worldwide, included in theatrically distributed collections such as Mike Judge's The Animation Show, and featured on high visibility comedy websites. 

Among his film festival presence is a record number of films screened in competition at the Sundance Film Festival by a one director (9), including "A Pack of Gifts Now" which was awarded "honorable mention" in 1999. Notable screenings also include a retrospective program of work shown at the Boston Museum of Fine Arts and the inclusion of CLOPS and CLOPS II in a program exploring social satire in cinema called "Situating Comedy" at the Solomon R. Guggenheim Museum in the year 2000.

Pilots
Quakenbush's work in television also includes producing and directing numerous live-action and animated pilots including those for Gary & Mike and Drew Carey's Green Screen Show, although he did not participate in the subsequent series.  In 2010, Quakenbush joined the directing roster of the commercial production company, ka-chew! He was also a director on the TBS television series The Chimp Channel. 

Apart from his filmmaking, Quakenbush is also an instructor in the art of Aikido and founder of Kakushi Toride Aikido.

References

External links

American filmmakers
American television producers
Living people
Year of birth missing (living people)